Mirror Traffic is the fifth studio album by Stephen Malkmus and the Jicks, released on August 23, 2011 by Matador Records. It is the first collaboration between Stephen Malkmus and producer Beck and also the last album to feature drummer Janet Weiss, who moved on to become a member of Wild Flag. As of November 2013, the album has sold 30,000 copies in the U.S. according to Nielsen SoundScan.

Critical response

Mirror Traffic has received positive reviews. Spin called it "a patient, inviting album that feels like a fresh start from a guy whose recording career spans multiple boom-and-bust cycles, both for indie rock and the economy."

Track listing

References

Stephen Malkmus albums
2011 albums
Matador Records albums
Domino Recording Company albums
Albums produced by Beck